Barry J. Hobbins (born May 17, 1951) is an American lawyer, politician and is the current Public Advocate of Maine. A Democrat, he served in the Maine House of Representatives, representing part of Saco. As a State Senator, he represented several towns in York County, including Buxton, Dayton, Old Orchard Beach as well as Saco.

His election to the Maine House in 2012 came after serving for 8 consecutive years in the Maine Senate (2004-2012). From 2010 to 2012, Hobbins served as the Minority Leader of the Maine Senate.

Hobbins is a practicing attorney and law-firm partner in Saco. From 1988 to 2007, Hobbins served on the University of New England Board of Trustees.

Biography
Hobbins was first elected to the 106th legislature in 1972 at the age of 21. In 1973, he earned a BA from the University of Maine and, in 1977, a JD from Franklin Pierce Law Center. Hobbins was elected as a State Senator in 2004 and began his third term in 2010.

As an attorney, Hobbins served as chair of the Judiciary Committee in the State Senate and a member of the Utility and Energy Committee.

In April 2017, Hobbins was nominated by Gov. Paul LePage to serve as the State of Maine's next utility ratepayer advocate.

References

External links 
 Our Campaigns Page on Barry Hobbins

1951 births
Living people
People from Saco, Maine
Maine lawyers
Democratic Party members of the Maine House of Representatives
Minority leaders of the Maine Senate
University of Maine alumni
University of New Hampshire School of Law alumni
21st-century American politicians